Medveďov is a border village and municipality in the Dunajská Streda District in the Trnava Region of south-west Slovakia.

Geography
The municipality lies at an altitude of 111 metres and covers an area of 10.388 km².  The village lies near the border with Hungary, near the Danube.

History
In the 9th century, the territory of Medveďov became part of the Kingdom of Hungary. The name of the village was first mentioned in 1252 as Willa Medwe castri Posoniensis (Medve village of the Pozsony Castle). Until the end of World War I, the village was part of Hungary and fell within the Tószigetcsilizköz district of Győr County. After the Austro-Hungarian army disintegrated in November 1918, Czechoslovakian troops occupied the area. After the Treaty of Trianon of 1920, the village became officially part of Czechoslovakia. In November 1938, the First Vienna Award granted the area to Hungary and it was held by Hungary until 1945. After Soviet occupation in 1945, Czechoslovakian administration returned and the village became officially part of Czechoslovakia in 1947. The village suffered a major flood in 1895, 1956 and on 17 June 1965.

Demography 
In 1910, the village had 781, for the most part, Hungarian inhabitants. At the 2001 Census the recorded population of the village was 583 while an end-2008 estimate by the Statistical Office had the village's population as 574. As of 2001, 87.31% of its population was Hungarian while 11.15% was Slovak.

Roman Catholicism is the majority religion of the village, its adherents numbering 83.36% of the total population.

Gallery

References 

Villages and municipalities in Dunajská Streda District
Hungarian communities in Slovakia